The Unicorn Murders is a mystery novel by the American writer John Dickson Carr (1906–1977), who published it under the name of Carter Dickson.  It is a locked room mystery (more precisely, it is a subset of that group, an impossible mystery) and features his series detective, Sir Henry Merrivale.

Plot summary
Kenwood Blake is with the British Secret Service and romantically involved with another agent, Evelyn Cheyne.  Together with Sir Henry Merrivale, they become embroiled in a battle between Flamande, the most picturesque criminal in France, and his arch-enemy Gaston Gasquet of the Sûreté.

Both Flamande and Gasquet are masters of disguise, and no one knows what either man looks like.  Blake, Merrivale and an assorted group of strangers are in an airplane that is forced to land near the Château de l'Ile, where the Comte d'Andrieu is apparently expecting visitors and offers them all his hospitality.

One of the plane's passengers falls to the ground with a hole in his forehead, as if he had been gored by a unicorn, and the area where he fell was under observation by impartial witnesses such that it seems impossible for anyone to have committed the murder.

Sir Henry must sort out the twin problems of who's really who and whodunnit.

1935 American novels
Novels by John Dickson Carr
Novels set in France
Locked-room mysteries
William Morrow and Company books